Polina Aleksandrovna Shchennikova (Russian: Полина  Александровна Шенникова (born January 7, 1998) is a former Russian-American artistic gymnast. She was a member of the U.S. National team from 2012 to 2013.  

Polina was born to Russian parents Katia and Aleksandr Shchennikov, and moved to Colorado at the age of 8. Both her parents competed as gymnasts for the Soviet National Team. Polina competed at the US National Championships in 2013 as a junior and in 2015 as a senior. In 2015, Shchennikova committed to the Michigan Wolverines women's gymnastics program. She was Freshman of the year at the University of Michigan and later went on to become the student assistant coach for the gymnastics team.

References 

1998 births
American female artistic gymnasts
American people of Russian descent
People from Evergreen, Colorado
Michigan Wolverines women's gymnasts
Living people
U.S. women's national team gymnasts